Special affine curvature, also known as the equiaffine curvature or affine curvature, is a particular type of curvature that is defined on a plane curve that remains unchanged under a special affine transformation (an affine transformation that preserves area). The curves of constant equiaffine curvature  are precisely all non-singular plane conics.

The usual Euclidean curvature of a curve at a point is the curvature of its osculating circle, the unique circle making second order contact (having three point contact) with the curve at the point. In other words it is the limiting position of the (unique) conic through  and four points  on the curve, as each of the points approaches :

Where the general affine group is not used, the special affine curvature  is sometimes also called the affine curvature.

Formal definition

Special affine arclength
To define the special affine curvature, it is necessary first to define the special affine arclength (also called the equiaffine arclength). Consider an affine plane curve .

In particular, the determinant

is a well-defined invariant of the special affine group, and gives the signed area of the parallelogram spanned by the velocity and acceleration of the curve . This determinant undergoes then a transformation of the following sort, by the chain rule:

The reparameterization can be chosen so that

Existence and uniqueness of such a parameterization follows by integration:

This integral is called the special affine arclength, and a curve carrying this parameterization is said to be parameterized with respect to its special affine arclength.

Special affine curvature
Suppose that  is a curve parameterized with its special affine arclength.  Then the special affine curvature (or equiaffine curvature) is given by

More generally, for a plane curve with arbitrary parameterization

the special affine curvature is:

provided the first and second derivatives of the curve are linearly independent.  In the special case of a graph , these formulas reduce to

Affine curvature
Suppose as above that  is a curve parameterized by special affine arclength.  There are a pair of invariants of the curve that are invariant under the full general affine group — the group of all affine motions of the plane, not just those that are area-preserving.  The first of these is

sometimes called the affine arclength (although this risks confusion with the special affine arclength described above).  The second is referred to as the affine curvature:

Conics
Suppose that  is a curve parameterized by special affine arclength with constant affine curvature .  Let

Note that  since  is assumed to carry the special affine arclength parameterization, and that

It follows from the form of  that

By applying a suitable special affine transformation, we can arrange that  is the identity matrix.  Since  is constant, it follows that  is given by the matrix exponential

The three cases are now as follows.

If the curvature vanishes identically, then upon passing to a limit,

so , and so integration gives

up to an overall constant translation, which is the special affine parameterization of the parabola .

If the special affine curvature is positive, then it follows that

so that

up to a translation, which is the special affine parameterization of the ellipse .

If  is negative, then the trigonometric functions in  give way to hyperbolic functions:

Thus

up to a translation, which is the special affine parameterization of the hyperbola

Characterization up to affine congruence
The special affine curvature of an immersed curve is the only (local) invariant of the curve in the following sense:

If two curves have the same special affine curvature at every point, then one curve is obtained from the other by means of a special affine transformation.

In fact, a slightly stronger statement holds:

Given any continuous function , there exists a curve  whose first and second derivatives are linearly independent, such that the special affine curvature of  relative to the special affine parameterization is equal to the given function .  The curve  is uniquely determined up to a special affine transformation.

This is analogous to the fundamental theorem of curves in the classical Euclidean differential geometry of curves, in which the complete classification of plane curves up to Euclidean motion depends on a single function , the curvature of the curve.  It follows essentially by applying the Picard–Lindelöf theorem to the system

where .  An alternative approach, rooted in the theory of moving frames, is to apply the existence of a primitive for the Darboux derivative.

Derivation of the curvature by affine invariance
The special affine curvature can be derived explicitly by techniques of invariant theory.  For simplicity, suppose that an affine plane curve is given in the form of a graph .  The special affine group acts on the Cartesian plane via transformations of the form

The following vector fields span the Lie algebra of infinitesimal generators of the special affine group:

An affine transformation not only acts on points, but also on the tangent lines to graphs of the form .  That is, there is an action of the special affine group on triples of coordinates . The group action is generated by vector fields

defined on the space of three variables .  These vector fields can be determined by the following two requirements:
 Under the projection onto the -plane, they must to project to the corresponding original generators of the action , respectively.
 The vectors must preserve up to scale the contact structure of the jet space

Concretely, this means that the generators  must satisfy

where  is the Lie derivative.

Similarly, the action of the group can be extended to the space of any number of derivatives .

The prolonged vector fields generating the action of the special affine group must then inductively satisfy, for each generator :
  preserves the contact ideal:

where

Carrying out the inductive construction up to order 4 gives

The special affine curvature

The vector field  acts diagonally as a modified homogeneity operator, and it is readily verified that .  Finally,

The five vector fields

Concretely, each leaf is a local orbit of the special affine group. The function  parameterizes these leaves.

Human motor system
Human curvilinear 2-dimensional drawing movements tend to follow the equiaffine parametrization. This is more commonly known as the two thirds power law, according to which the hand's speed is proportional to the Euclidean curvature raised to the minus third power. Namely, 

See also
Affine geometry of curves
Affine sphere

References

Sources
 
 
 
 
 

Differential geometry
Curves
Affine geometry